Eric Barlow (born May 8, 1966) is an American politician current serving as the Speaker of the Wyoming House of Representatives since January 12, 2021 and a Republican member of the chamber representing District 3 since January 8, 2013.

Education
Barlow earned his DVM from Colorado State University.

Elections
2012: When Republican Representative Frank Peasley retired and left the District 3 seat open, Barlow won the August 21, 2012 Republican Primary and defeated Douglas Gerard with 802 votes (49.8%), and was unopposed for the November 6, 2012 General election, winning with 3,670 votes.
2014: Barlow again defeated Douglas Gerard in the August 19, 2014 Republican Primary with 959 votes (53.0%), and was unopposed in the November 4, 2014 General Election, winning with 2,222 votes.
2016: Barlow defeated Frank Eathorne in the August 16, 2016 Republican Primary, winning with 1,207 votes (60.23%). Barlow was then unopposed in the November 8, 2016 General Election, winning with 3,822 votes.
2018: Barlow was unopposed in both the August 21, 2018 Republican Primary and the November 6, 2018 General Election, winning with 1,746 and 2,811 votes respectively. 
2020: Barlow won the August 18, 2020 Republican Primary against Martin E. Phillips with 1,545 votes (70.3%), and was unopposed for the November 3, 2020 General Election, winning with 4,016 votes.

References

External links
Official page at the Wyoming Legislature
 

|-

1966 births
21st-century American politicians
American veterinarians
Colorado State University alumni
Living people
Male veterinarians
People from Gillette, Wyoming
Republican Party members of the Wyoming House of Representatives
Speakers of the Wyoming House of Representatives